Stenner is a surname. Notable people with the surname include:

 Eloise Stenner (born 1997), English international field hockey player 
 Hermann Stenner (1891–1914), German Expressionist painter 
 John Stenner (1964–1994), American cyclist
 Jonathan Stenner (born 1966), English gastroenterologist and first-class cricketer
 Karen Stenner, Australian political scientist